Medford is a city in and the county seat of Grant County, Oklahoma, United States.  As of the 2010 census, the city population was 996.

History
The Encyclopedia of Oklahoma History and Culture states only that the town name was for Medford, Massachusetts, which it says was the home town of a railroad official.

Before the opening of the Cherokee Outlet to non-Indian settlement on September 16, 1893, the Chicago, Kansas and Nebraska Railway (later the Chicago, Rock Island and Pacific Railroad) built a line from southern Kansas that passed through the future Medford townsite in a north–south direction.  A post office was established October 31, 1893. The townsfolk voted to incorporate on March 10, 1894. In 1897 the Gulf Railroad (later the Atchison, Topeka and Santa Fe Railway) built a line that passed through Medford from northwest to southeast. Located in a wheat-growing region, Medford served as an agricultural trade center with a flour mill and several grain elevators. By 1909 the local economy supported three banks and three weekly newspapers.

Voters in Grant County chose Medford as the county seat by an election on May 27, 1908. A courthouse was dedicated  July 4, 1910. A fire destroyed five blocks of businesses and residences on June 25, 1911.

On July 9, 2022 at about 2:30 PM an explosion and fire in the ONEOK plant one mile north of the city caused an evacuation of a two mile radius around the plant. On July 11, the evacuation zone was decreased to one mile around the plant.

Geography
Medford is located at  (36.806457, −97.736918). It is situated at the intersection of U.S. Highway 81 (Chisholm Trail Highway) and State Highway 11.

Demographics

As of the census of 2000, there were 1,172 people, 480 households, and 304 families residing in the city. The population density was 1,099.1 people per square mile (422.9/km). There were 591 housing units at an average density of 554.3 per square mile (213.3/km). The racial makeup of the city was 95.82% White, 0.17% African American, 2.30% Native American, 0.09% Asian, 1.02% from other races, and 0.60% from two or more races. Hispanic or Latino of any race were 1.96% of the population.

There were 480 households, out of which 30.4% had children under the age of 18 living with them, 53.5% were married couples living together, 7.1% had a female householder with no husband present, and 36.5% were non-families. Of all households, 35.0% were made up of individuals, and 20.4% had someone living alone who was 65 years of age or older. The average household size was 2.32 and the average family size was 3.01.

In the city, the population was spread out, with 24.7% under the age of 18, 6.7% from 18 to 24, 23.7% from 25 to 44, 20.7% from 45 to 64, and 24.1% who were 65 years of age or older. The median age was 41 years. For every 100 females, there were 91.5 males. For every 100 females age 18 and over, there were 90.5 males.

The median income for a household in the city was $27,708, and the median income for a family was $38,571. Males had a median income of $29,167 versus $18,667 for females. The per capita income for the city was $15,848. About 10.4% of families and 13.8% of the population were below the poverty line, including 15.9% of those under age 18 and 12.4% of those age 65 or over.

Government
Medford has a council-manager form of government.

Notable people
 James Kilian, professional football player
 Dennis Reimer, U.S. Army general and former Army Chief of Staff
 Apollo Soucek (1897–1955), test pilot and vice admiral in the U.S. Navy
 Travis Unwin (aka Evo Terra), American podcaster, author, radio broadcaster, and businessman.

See also

 National Register of Historic Places listings in Grant County, Oklahoma

References

Cities in Grant County, Oklahoma
Cities in Oklahoma
County seats in Oklahoma